Saint-Quay-Portrieux (Breton: San-Ke-Porz-Olued) is a commune in the Côtes-d'Armor department of Brittany in northwestern France.

Population

Inhabitants of Saint-Quay-Portrieux are called quinocéens in French.

See also
Communes of the Côtes-d'Armor department

References

External links

Official website 

Communes of Côtes-d'Armor
Seaside resorts in France